Daybreakers is a 2009 science-fiction action horror film written and directed by Michael and Peter Spierig. The film takes place in a futuristic world overrun by vampires, and centers around a vampiric corporation which sets out to capture and farm the remaining humans while researching a substitute for human blood. Ethan Hawke plays vampire hematologist Edward Dalton, whose work is interrupted by human survivors led by former vampire "Elvis" (Willem Dafoe), who has a cure that can save the human species.

An international co-production between Australia and the United States, Daybreakers premiered at the Toronto International Film Festival in 2009. It was released in the United Kingdom on 6 January 2010 and in North America on 8 January 2010. The film grossed over $50 million worldwide and received mixed critical reception.

Plot
In 2009, a plague caused by an infected bat transforms most of the world's population into immortal vampires. The human population plummets, leaving vampires with a severe shortage of blood; vampires deprived of blood degenerate into psychotic, bat-like "subsiders". Most humans are captured and harvested in laboratory farms while scientists research a synthetic Substitute. As sunlight is deadly to vampires, underground passages and UV-filtered cars are built for safe travel, while the few free humans travel by day, hiding in open spaces.

In 2019, Edward Dalton is the head hematologist for Bromley Marks, a pharmaceutical company that is the largest supplier of human blood in the US. Edward and colleague Christopher Caruso are developing a blood substitute.

Driving home from a failed experiment, Dalton accidentally runs another vehicle off the road. Discovering the occupants are humans, Dalton hides them from the police. Before they part ways, their leader, Audrey, learns Edward's name and occupation from his ID badge.

At home, Edward is surprised by his estranged brother Frankie. Frankie's gift of a bottle of pure human blood reignites a long-standing argument – Edward refuses to drink human blood and uses animal blood instead, while Frankie enjoys his vampire status. A subsider, a gardener from Edward’s neighborhood, invades the house, forcing the brothers to kill it.

The next morning, Audrey visits Edward's home, giving him instructions for a meeting. There, Edward is introduced to Lionel "Elvis" Cormac, a human who was once a vampire. Before he can explain his reversion, a military team arrives with Frankie, who followed Edward and intends to capture Cormac and Audrey. Audrey knocks Frankie unconscious and the three escape. Cormac reveals that he was cured of vampirism when a car crash ejected him from his sun-proof vehicle. Elvis burst into flames in the sunlight but landed in a river, having been exposed to the sun for a precise length of time to turn him human again. Edward agrees to help Cormac find a way to recreate the cure and prevent human genocide.

At a vineyard that night, Edward meets more humans and Senator Wes Turner, a vampire secretly helping the colony develop a cure. An approaching convoy of humans is captured, and vampire soldiers track the location of the vineyard, forcing Turner and the humans to flee. Audrey, Cormac, and Edward stay behind, and together they recreate the method by which Cormac reverted to human form, curing Edward of vampirism. They later find Turner and all the humans dead.

Alison Bromley, one of the captured humans, is revealed to be the daughter of Charles Bromley (CEO of Bromley Marks), who refused to become a vampire like her father. Charles has Frankie forcibly turn his daughter Alison into a vampire, but she refuses to drink human blood. Devolving into a subsider, Alison and others are executed by being burnt to death by sunlight. Upset at witnessing Alison's death, Frankie seeks out his brother. The military imposes martial law to control the subsider population.

Edward, Cormac, and Audrey break into Christopher's home and ask him to help spread the cure. Having finally discovered a viable blood substitute, and feeling overshadowed by Edward, Christopher is uninterested in a cure and summons soldiers, who capture Audrey while Cormac and Edward escape. They are found by Frankie, who agrees to help but his instincts cause him to bite Cormac, but drinking his blood turns Frankie human, revealing that the sunlight cure is unnecessary.

Trying to save Audrey, Edward turns himself in to Charles, who gloats about Bromley Marks' new monopoly on the blood substitute, as using blood substitute to cure blood loss in humans is much less profitable than selling it as grocery to the vampire population. Charles reveals his plan to continue hunting humans and sell their blood for exorbitant prices, as "people are always willing to pay extra for the real thing." Edward taunts Charles into biting him, turning Charles human.

Edward leaves Charles to be killed at the hands of human-blood-thirsty-soldiers on the brink of becoming subsiders. Frankie arrives and sacrifices himself to the soldiers which allows Edward and Audrey to escape. In the ensuing feeding frenzy, only six soldiers are left standing, now cured. To conceal the cure, Christopher shoots the soldiers and is about to shoot Edward and Audrey when Cormac kills him with a crossbow.

The three survivors drive off into the sunrise. In a voiceover, Edward announces the cure will change the general population back to restore humanity.

Cast
 Ethan Hawke as Edward Dalton. He is a 35-year-old vampire hematologist who was turned by his brother Frankie, and started working for the newly formed Bromley Marks to work on a blood substitute. He shows sympathy for the humans, since he refused to be turned at the start of the plague, and refuses to drink human blood, instead relying on animal blood. He volunteers for the project to be turned back into a human and leads a revolution to return the human race back.
 Willem Dafoe as Lionel "Elvis" Cormac. A former professional mechanic, he was one of the first in the city to adapt cars for daylight driving, with retractable UV screens and exterior cameras. One time, while driving during the daytime, he was exhausted from not drinking blood, which caused him to be distracted and crash his black 1957 Chevy Bel Air into a fence, ejecting him into the sunshine; Elvis burst into flames, but his life was saved when he fell into the water, turning him back into a human due to the precise exposure to the sun. He was found by Audrey.
 Sam Neill as Charles Bromley, ruthless owner of Bromley Marks, the largest provider of blood in the U.S. In 2008, shortly before the plague, he was diagnosed with cancer and expected to live only a few years. He became a vampire to save himself from cancer, at the cost of being rejected by his beloved daughter Alison. He has no interest in becoming human again, since he wants to use the substitute to become the richest man alive and for all eternity.
 Claudia Karvan as Audrey Bennett, who was educating at college during the plague. She hid on her family's old vineyard, and refusing to become a vampire, she gathered humans and sheltered them. She also found the already cured Elvis and sheltered him. They lead the group to try to find other survivors.
 Michael Dorman as Frankie Dalton, Edward's estranged younger brother, who turned his brother into a vampire since he was afraid of losing him. Ed had previously said that he would rather die than become a vampire, so Frankie turned him by force because he couldn't bear to have his brother die. Frankie has an epiphany after turning back into a human and wants to help, but is later killed while trying to help his brother.
 Isabel Lucas as Alison Bromley, Charles' estranged daughter, forcibly turned into a vampire by Frankie. She rejected her father and turned into a subsider after drinking her own blood. Her death caused Frankie to have an epiphany and change sides.
 Vince Colosimo as Christopher Caruso, a hematologist, Edward's coworker at Bromley Marks, although much less ambitious than Edward. He succeeds in creating a blood substitute, which would make him wealthy and powerful in a world of vampires, and so is hostile to the possibility of a cure for vampirism.
 Jay Laga'aia as Senator Wes Turner, another vampire who secretly harbors sympathies with humans and wants to help the human race.

Production
In November 2004, Lionsgate acquired the script to Daybreakers, written by Peter and Michael Spierig. The brothers, who directed Undead (2003), were attached to direct Daybreakers. In September 2006, the brothers received financing from Film Finance Corporation Australia, with production set to take place in Queensland. In May 2007, actor Ethan Hawke was cast into the lead role. Later in the month, actor Sam Neill joined the cast as the main antagonist. Daybreakers began filming on the Gold Coast at Warner Bros. Movie World studios and in Brisbane on 16 July 2007. The production budget was $US21 million, with the State Government contributing $US1 million to the filmmakers. Principal photography was completed on schedule in September 2007, with reshoots following to extend key sequences.

Weta Workshop created the creature effects for Daybreakers. The Spierig brothers wanted the vampires in the film to have a classical aesthetic to them while feeling like a more contemporary interpretation. After experimenting with complex makeup designs, they decided that a more minimalistic approach to makeup had a more powerful effect.

Hawke was initially hesitant to join the production as he was "not a big fan" of genre films. He ultimately accepted the role as Edward after deciding the story felt "different" from that of a typical B movie. Hawke described the film as an allegory of man's pacing with natural resources, "We're eating our own resources so people are trying to come up with blood substitutes, trying to get us off of foreign humans." The actor also said that despite the serious allegory, the film was "low art" and "completely unpretentious and silly".

Release
Daybreakers premiered on 11 September 2009 at the 34th Annual Toronto International Film Festival. The film was released on 6 January 2010 in the UK and Ireland, 8 January 2010 in North America, and 4 February 2010 in Australia.

Critical reception
On Rotten Tomatoes the film has an approval rating of 68% based on reviews from 155 critics, with an average rating of 6.1/10. The website's critical consensus states: "Though it arrives during an unfortunate glut of vampire movies, Daybreakers offers enough dark sci-fi thrills — and enough of a unique twist on the genre — to satisfy filmgoers." On Metacritic the film has a weighted average score of 57 out of 100 based on 31 reviews, indicating "mixed or average reviews". Audiences surveyed by CinemaScore gave the film an average grade of "C" on an A+ to F scale.

Variety gave the film a mixed review stating the film had a "cold, steely blue, black and gray 'Matrix'-y look" going on to say Daybreakers "emerges as a competent but routine chase thriller that lacks attention-getting dialogue, unique characters or memorable setpieces that might make it a genre keeper rather than a polished time-filler." Rolling Stone gave the film two and a half out of four stars and called the film a B movie and a "nifty genre piece". Roger Ebert also gave the film two and a half stars stating the "intriguing premise ... ends as so many movies do these days, with fierce fights and bloodshed." Richard Roeper gave the film a B+ and called it "a bloody good time."

Box office
As of October 2010, the global box gross was US$51,416,464, including $30,101,577 in the US. In its opening weekend in the United States, Daybreakers opened at No. 4 behind Avatar, Sherlock Holmes and Alvin and the Chipmunks: The Squeakquel with $15,146,692 in 2,523 theaters, averaging $6,003 per theater.

Home media
Daybreakers was released on DVD and Blu-ray in the United States on 11 May 2010 and in the United Kingdom on 31 May 2010. The UK DVD copy was rated as an 18 instead of the original 15 rating that was used for cinema release. A 3D Blu-ray version of the film was released in November 2011. The film was re-released in the 4K Ultra HD Blu-ray format on September 10, 2019.

See also
 Vampire film

References

External links
 
 
 

2009 films
2009 horror films
2000s science fiction horror films
American science fiction horror films
American action horror films
American science fiction action films
American action adventure films
American dystopian films
Adventure horror films
Films set in 2019
Films set in the future
Films set in the United States
Lionsgate films
American vampire films
Films directed by Spierig brothers
Films shot in Brisbane
Australian science fiction horror films
Australian action horror films
Australian science fiction action films
Australian action adventure films
Films shot at Village Roadshow Studios
2000s English-language films
2000s American films